In the field of topology, a Fréchet–Urysohn space is a topological space  with the property that for every subset  the closure of  in  is identical to the sequential closure of  in  
Fréchet–Urysohn spaces are a special type of sequential space. 

Fréchet–Urysohn spaces are the most general class of spaces for which sequences suffice to determine all topological properties of subsets of the space. 
That is, Fréchet–Urysohn spaces are exactly those spaces for which knowledge of which sequences converge to which limits (and which sequences do not) suffices to completely determine the space's topology. 
Every Fréchet–Urysohn space is a sequential space but not conversely. 

The space is named after Maurice Fréchet and Pavel Urysohn.

Definitions

Let  be a topological space. 

where  or  may be written if clarity is needed. 

A topological space  is said to be a  if  

Sequentially open/closed sets

Suppose that  is any subset of  
A sequence  is  if there exists a positive integer  such that  for all indices  

Typically, if  is understood then  is written in place of  

The set  is called  if  or equivalently, if whenever  is a sequence in  converging to  then  must also be in  
The complement of a sequentially open set is a sequentially closed set, and vice versa. 

Let 

The set  is a topology on  that is finer than the original topology  

Strong Fréchet–Urysohn space

The above properties can be expressed as selection principles.

Contrast to sequential spaces

However, the converses are in general not true. 
The spaces for which the converses are true are called ; 
that is, a sequential space is a topological space in which every sequentially open subset is necessarily open, or equivalently, it is a space in which every sequentially closed subset is necessarily closed. 
Every Fréchet-Urysohn space is a sequential space but there are sequential spaces that are not Fréchet-Urysohn spaces. 

In any space that is  sequential, there exists a subset for which this "test" gives a "false positive."

Characterizations

If  is a topological space then the following are equivalent:

 is a Fréchet–Urysohn space.
Definition:  for every subset 
 for every subset 
 This statement is equivalent to the definition above because  always holds for every 
 Contrast this condition to the following characterization of a sequential space:
 This characterization implies that every Fréchet–Urysohn space is a sequential space.

The characterization below shows that from among Hausdorff sequential spaces, Fréchet–Urysohn spaces are exactly those for which a "cofinal convergent diagonal sequence" can always be found, similar to the diagonal principal that is used to characterize topologies in terms of convergent nets.  In the following characterization, all convergence is assumed to take place in  

then there exist strictly increasing maps  such that  

(It suffices to consider only sequences  with infinite ranges (i.e.  is infinite) because if it is finite then Hausdorffness implies that it is necessarily eventually constant with value  in which case the existence of the maps  with the desired properties is readily verified for this special case (even if  is not a Fréchet–Urysohn space).

Properties

Every Fréchet–Urysohn space is a sequential space although the opposite implication is not true in general.

Examples

Every first-countable space is a Fréchet–Urysohn space. Consequently, every second-countable space, every metrizable space, and every pseudometrizable space is a Fréchet–Urysohn space. It also follows that every topological space  on a finite set  is a Fréchet–Urysohn space.

Metrizable continuous dual spaces

A metrizable locally convex topological vector space (TVS)  (for example, a Fréchet space) is a normable space if and only if its strong dual space  is a Fréchet–Urysohn space, or equivalently, if and only if  is a normable space.

Sequential spaces that are not Fréchet–Urysohn

Direct limit of finite-dimensional Euclidean spaces

  is a Hausdorff sequential space that is not Fréchet–Urysohn. 
 
From these facts, it follows that  is a sequential space. 
Let  
In fact, it can be shown that 
 
This proves that  is not a Fréchet–Urysohn space.

Montel DF-spaces

Every infinite-dimensional Montel DF-space is a sequential space but  a Fréchet–Urysohn space.

The Schwartz space  and the space of smooth functions 

The following extensively used spaces are prominent examples of sequential spaces that are not Fréchet–Urysohn spaces.
Let  denote the Schwartz space and let  denote the space of smooth functions on an open subset  where both of these spaces have their usual Fréchet space topologies, as defined in the article about distributions. 

See also

Notes

Citations

References

 Arkhangel'skii, A.V. and Pontryagin, L.S., General Topology I, Springer-Verlag, New York (1990) .
 Booth, P.I. and Tillotson, A., Monoidal closed, cartesian closed and convenient categories of topological spaces Pacific J. Math., 88 (1980) pp. 35–53.
 Engelking, R., General Topology, Heldermann, Berlin (1989). Revised and completed edition.
 Franklin, S. P., "Spaces in Which Sequences Suffice", Fund. Math. 57 (1965), 107-115.
 Franklin, S. P., "Spaces in Which Sequences Suffice II", Fund. Math. 61 (1967), 51-56.
 Goreham, Anthony, "Sequential Convergence in Topological Spaces"
 Steenrod, N.E., A convenient category of topological spaces, Michigan Math. J., 14 (1967), 133-152.
  

General topology
Properties of topological spaces